Adolf Bechtold  (20 February 1926 – 8 September 2012) was a German football player. He played his entire career with Eintracht Frankfurt winning the Championship with the main side.
An instrument mechanic, he played from 1938 until 1942 in the youth academy. From 1942 on, he played in the senior squad appearing over 400 times until 1960. His major honours were the German Championship in 1959 and the South German Championship in 1953 and 1959.
1959-60 Frankfurt reached the final of the European Cup, where they were defeated by Real Madrid by a score of 7-3. Bechtold was not a starter after that and made only one appearance in that European Cup season. This was his one and only international appearance because he never was capped for Germany.
He was an honoured member and captain of Eintracht Frankfurt.

Honours 
 German championship: 1958–59
 European Cup: runners-up 1959–60
 Oberliga Süd: 1952–53, 1958–59; runners-up 1953–54

See also
One-club man

References

Further reading
 
 Ulrich Matheja: Schlappekicker und Himmelsstürmer. Die Geschichte von Eintracht Frankfurt. Verlag Die Werkstatt. Göttingen 2004 (4. Ed. 2017).
 Werner Raupp: Toni Turek – „Fußballgott“. Eine Biographie. Hildesheim: Arete Verlag 2019 (1., rev. Ed.), p. 52–58.

External links 
 Adolf Bechtold at eintracht-archiv.de

1926 births
2012 deaths
German footballers
Eintracht Frankfurt players
Association football defenders
Footballers from Frankfurt